Zameen Aasmaan is a 1984 Indian film directed by Bharat Rangachary and produced by Uday Narayan Singh and Subhash Gupta. The movie stars Shashi Kapoor, Raakhee, Rekha, Sanjay Dutt and Anita Raj.

Cast 

Shashi Kapoor as Dr. Kailash
Rakhee Gulzar as Kavita
Rekha as Kanchan Gupta
Sanjay Dutt as Sanjay
Anita Raj as Anita
Mazhar Khan as Rakesh Kumar Gupta
Satyendra Kapoor as Doctor
Kalpana Iyer as Dancer
Manik Irani as Goon

Soundtrack
All tracks were composed by R.D. Burman. Lyrics were written by Anjaan. The song "Aisa Sama Na Hota, Kuch Bhi Yahan Na Hota, Mere Humrahi Jo Tum Na Hote" sung by Lataji remains a timeless classic.

Trivia
In the dance sequence in Studio29, the superhit song by Bee Gees 'More than a women' is being played in the background.

External links
 

1984 films
1980s Hindi-language films
Films scored by R. D. Burman
1984 drama films
Indian drama films
Films directed by Bharat Rangachary
Hindi-language drama films